"Since I Fell for You" is a blues ballad composed by Buddy Johnson in 1945 that was first popularized by his sister, Ella Johnson, with Buddy Johnson and His Orchestra.  

A version by Annie Laurie with Paul Gayten and His Trio in 1947 led to its eventual establishment as a jazz and pop standard.  The song peaked at number three on the Billboard Race Records chart and number twenty on the pop chart.

Lenny Welch recording
The biggest hit version of "Since I Fell for You" was recorded by Lenny Welch in 1963, reaching number four on the U.S. Billboard Hot 100 chart on December 28, 1963. It also reached number three on the Easy Listening chart.

Charting recordings
"Since I Fell for You" has been charted by many artists including: 
 Laura Lee (US #76, 1972)
 Charlie Rich (US #71; AC #11; Country #10, 1976)
 Con Hunley (US Country #20, 1979)
 Al Jarreau (US AC #10; Canada AC #3, 1987)

References

1945 songs
1940s jazz standards
1963 singles
1976 singles
1987 singles
Charlie Rich songs
Al Jarreau songs
Songs written by Buddy Johnson
Pop standards
Torch songs